Robert Beverley may refer to:
Robert Beverley Sr. (1635-1687), clerk of the House of Burgesses, major landowner and father of Robert Beverley Jr.
Robert Beverley Jr. (1673–1722), burgess and historian of early colonial Virginia
Robert G. Beverly (1925–2009), member of the California legislature
Robert Mackenzie Beverley (1798–1868), author, magistrate and controversialist
Robert of Beverley (died 1285), mason and sculptor
Robert Beverley (MP) (by 1522–1558/63), Member of Parliament (MP) for Mitchell and Bossiney